The 1949 All-SEC football team consists of American football players selected to the All-Southeastern Conference (SEC) chosen by various selectors for the 1949 college football season. Tulane won the conference.

All-SEC selections

Ends
Bud Sherrod, Tennessee (AP-1, UP-1)
Sam Lyle, LSU (AP-1, UP-2)
Jack Stribling, Ole Miss (AP-2, UP-1)
Bob Walston, Georgia (AP-2, UP-2)
Bucky Curtis, Vanderbilt (AP-3)
Dick Harvin, Georgia Tech (AP-3)

Tackles
Bob Gain, Kentucky (College Football Hall of Fame)  (AP-1, UP-1) 
Paul Lea, Tulane (AP-1, UP-2)
Ray Collins, LSU (AP-2, UP-2)
Carl Copp, Vanderbilt (AP-3, UP-1)
Tom Coleman, Georgia Tech (AP-2)
Marion Campbell, Georgia (AP-3)

Guards
Ed Holdnak, Alabama (AP-1, UP-1)
Allen Hover, LSU (AP-1, UP-2)
Jimmy Crawford, Ole Miss (AP-2, UP-1)
Dennis Doyle, Tulane (AP-2, UP-2)
Mike Mizerany, Alabama (AP-3)
Ted Daffer, Tennessee (AP-3)

Centers
Harry Ulinski, Kentucky (AP-1, UP-1)
Jerry Taylor, Miss. St. (AP-2, UP-2)
Jimmy Kynes, Florida (AP-3)

Quarterbacks
Travis Tidwell, Auburn (AP-1, UP-1)
Babe Parilli, Kentucky (AP-2, UP-2)

Halfbacks
Eddie Price, Tulane (College Football Hall of Fame) (AP-1, UP-1)
Chuck Hunsinger, Florida (AP-1, UP-1)
Jimmy Jordan, Georgia Tech (AP-2)
Herb Rich, Vanderbilt (AP-2)
Floyd Reid, Georgia (AP-3, UP-2)
Ed Salem, Alabama (UP-2)
Jimmy Roshto, LSU (UP-2)
Don Phelps, Kentucky (AP-3)
Butch Avinger, Alabama (AP-3)
Lee Nalley, Vanderbilt (AP-3)

Fullbacks
John Dotley, Ole Miss (AP-1, UP-1)
Zollie Toth, LSU (AP-2)

Key

AP = Associated Press.

UP = United Press

Bold = Consensus first-team selection by both AP and UP

See also
1949 College Football All-America Team

References

All-SEC
All-SEC football teams